William Osgoode (March 1754 – January 17, 1824) was the first Chief Justice of Upper Canada (now known as Ontario, Canada).

Life and career
He was born William Osgood in London, England, in 1754 to William Osgood (died 1767). His family was Methodist and John Wesley recounted on Sunday, 13 December 1767 that "I was desired to preach a funeral sermon for William Osgood. He came to London nearly thirty years ago, and from nothing increased more and more, till he was worth several thousands of pounds. He was a good man, and died in peace. Nevertheless, I believe his money was a great clog to him, and kept him in a poor, low state all his days, making no such advance as he might have done, either in holiness or happiness."

He attended Christ Church, Oxford and was called to the bar in 1779. On December 31, 1791, he was appointed first Chief Justice of Upper Canada. Although he mainly sought the opinions of lawyers from England, Osgoode attempted to adapt the English civil law of the time to fit the needs of a developing colony. For example, he allowed justices of the peace to perform marriages when Anglican priests were not readily available. Osgoode's Judicature Act of 1794 established a system of district courts and a superior provincial court. During his term, legislation was also introduced to abolish slavery. Osgoode also served as a member of John Graves Simcoe's Executive Council for Upper Canada. He also served as Speaker of the Legislative Council (the upper house of the Assembly) in both Upper Canada and Lower Canada.

In 1794, he became Chief Justice of Lower Canada. Osgoode came into conflict with Governor Robert Prescott over an attempt to sort out the issue of land grants in the region. When Prescott was recalled, he came into conflict with Prescott's successor, Lieutenant Governor Robert Shore Milnes. In 1801, Osgoode resigned and returned to London. He became a member of the Royal Commission on the Courts of Law and help form what eventually led to the Uniformity of Process Act in 1832. Unmarried, Osgoode died in London in 1824 and is buried in St. Mary's Church, Harrow-on-the-Hill.

Osgoode Hall, the location of the Ontario Court of Appeal and the headquarters of the Law Society of Ontario, was named after him, as was Osgoode Hall Law School. In addition, the former Osgoode Township in Ontario also bears his name.

References 

 
Finding aid to the "William Osgoode collection" at the Archives of the Law Society of Upper Canada

Alumni of Christ Church, Oxford
English barristers
Chief justices of Lower Canada
Chief justices of Upper Canada
Members of the Legislative Council of Upper Canada
Members of the Legislative Council of Lower Canada
Lawyers from London
1754 births
1824 deaths
British expatriates in Canada